Bill Clarke (5 October 1882 – 5 November 1945) was an Australian rules footballer who played with South Melbourne in the Victorian Football League (VFL).

References

External links 

1882 births
1945 deaths
Australian rules footballers from Victoria (Australia)
Sydney Swans players